Yanaqucha (Quechua yana black, qucha lake, "black lake",  Hispanicized spelling Yanacocha) is a  mountain in the La Raya mountain range in the Andes of Peru. It is situated in the Puno Region, Melgar Province, Santa Rosa District. Yanaqucha lies near the La Raya pass northwest of Khunurana, Puka Urqu and Mamaniri and southeast of Chimpulla.

References

Mountains of Puno Region
Mountains of Peru